Friederike Lütz (born 26 March 1988) is a German handball player for Buxtehuder SV and the German national team.

References

1988 births
Living people
German female handball players
Sportspeople from Dortmund
20th-century German women
21st-century German women